In computational complexity theory, a speedup theorem is a theorem that considers some algorithm solving a problem and demonstrates the existence of a more efficient algorithm solving the same problem. 

Examples:
Linear speedup theorem, that the space and time requirements of a Turing machine solving a decision problem can be reduced by a multiplicative constant factor.
Blum's speedup theorem, which provides speedup by any computable function (not just linear, as in the previous theorem).

See also
 Amdahl's law, the theoretical speedup in latency of the execution of a task at a fixed workload that can be expected of a system whose resources are improved.

References

Theorems in computational complexity theory